This is a list of episodes for @midnight that aired in 2013 and 2014.

2013

October

November

2014

January

February

March

April

May

June

July

August

September

October

November
The first week of shows from November 2014 were specially taped in New York City during the New York Comedy Festival.

December

References

External links
 
 

Lists of variety television series episodes